The Star is a family of US solid-propellant rocket motors originally developed by Thiokol and used by many space propulsion and launch vehicle stages.  They are used almost exclusively as an upper stage, often as an apogee kick motor.

Three Star 37 stages, and one Star 48 stage, were launched on solar escape trajectories; fast enough to leave the Sun's orbit and out into interstellar space, where barring the low chance of colliding with debris, they will travel past other stars in the Milky Way galaxy and survive potentially intact for millions of years.

Star 24 
The Star 24 (TE-M-640) is a solid fuel apogee kick motor, first qualified in 1973. It burns an 86% solids carboxyl-terminated polybutadiene (CTPB) fuel.

 Thiokol Star-24 family

Star 27 

The Star 27 is a solid apogee kick motor, with the 27 representing the approximate diameter of the stage in inches. It burns HTPB fuel with an average erosion rate of 0.0011 inches per second. When used on the Pegasus air-launch rocket payloads are capable of leaving Earth orbit.

A version of the Star 27, designated Star 27H, was used in the launch of the IBEX spacecraft. The spacecraft had a mass of 105 kg by itself and together with its Star 27 motor, 462 kg. The Star 27H helped it get to a higher orbit, beyond Earth's magnetosphere.

Star 37 

The Star 37 was first used as the engine for the Thor-Burner upper stage in 1965.  The Burner I used the Thiokol FW-4 (TE 364-1) engine and the Burner 2 used the Thiokol (TE-M-364-2).

The "-37" designation refers to the approximate diameter of the fuel casing in inches; Thiokol had also manufactured other motors such as the Star-40 and Star 48. Internally, Thiokol's designation was TE-M-364 for early versions, TE-M-714 for later ones, and TE-M-783 for a special HTPB model used for FLTSATCOM launches.

Subtypes are given one or more letter suffixes after the diameter number, or a trailing number (i.e., "-2") after the internal designation. Not surprisingly, the "T" prefix stands for Thiokol, and the following letter refers to the company division that developed the rocket motor. In this case, "M" refers to the Magna, UT Division. "E" refers to the Elkton, MD division.

The Star 37FM rocket motor was developed and qualified for use as an apogee kick motor on FLTSATCOM. The motor is a replacement for the Star 37E Delta, which has been discontinued. The Nozzle assembly uses a 3D carbon-carbon throat and a carbon-phenolic exit cone. Maximum propellant weight is 2350 pounds, while the motor has been qualified for propellant off-loading to 2257 pounds.

A spin-stabilized or thrust-vectoring version of Star 37 is used as the final stage of the Minotaur V launch vehicle.

The Pioneer 10 & 11, and Voyager 1 & 2 Propulsion Modules used Star 37E motors; each is now on a similar interstellar trajectory to its companion probe, and is set to leave the Solar System (except the Pioneer 11 stage, which is thought to have remained in solar orbit).

Star 48 

The Star 48 is a type of solid rocket motor developed primarily by Thiokol Propulsion, which was purchased by Orbital ATK in 2001. In 2018, Orbital ATK in turn was acquired by Northrop Grumman.

The "48" designation refers to the approximate diameter of the fuel casing in inches; Thiokol had also manufactured other motors such as the Star 37 and Star 30. Internally, Thiokol's designation was TE-M-711 for early versions, and TE-M-799 for later ones. Subtypes are given one or more letter suffixes after the diameter number, or a trailing number (i.e., "-2") after the internal designation. The "T" prefix stands for Thiokol, and the following letter refers to the company division that developed the rocket motor. In this case, "E" refers to the Elkton, MD division and the "M" stands for motor.

The most common use of the Star 48 was as the final stage of the Delta II launch vehicles. Other launchers such as ULA's Atlas 551 have also incorporated the motor, but with lower frequency. Onboard the Space Shuttle, the complete stage (motor plus accessories) was referred to as the Payload Assist Module (PAM), as the Shuttle could only take satellites to low Earth orbit. Because geostationary orbit is much more lucrative, the additional stage was needed for the final leg of the journey.  On such missions, the stage was spin-stabilized. A turntable, mounted in the shuttle payload bay or atop the previous Delta stage, spun the PAM and payload to approximately 60 rpm prior to release.

Usually after motor burnout and just prior to satellite release the spin is canceled out using a yo-yo de-spin technique.

A non-spinning, thrust-vectoring version of the Star 48 is available ("Star 48BV"), but much less common. A thrust-vectoring Star 48 is the final stage of the Minotaur IV+ launch vehicle.

A Star 48B motor used in the 3rd stage of the New Horizons probe was the first part of the New Horizons mission to reach Jupiter, crossing Pluto's orbit in 2015 at a distance of 200 million kilometers. It is now set to leave the Solar System, travelling on a similar interstellar trajectory to its companion probe for the indefinite future. 

In 2013 a Star 48GXV was tested for the Parker Solar Probe mission as the upper stage on an Atlas V 551 vehicle, but the development was cancelled, in favor of a Delta IV Heavy / Star 48BV combination.

References 

Star 37 motors

External links
 Astronautix - Star 27
 Solid Propellant Rocket Fundamentals  (Pages 417-418)

Rocket stages
Solid-fuel rockets
Alliant Techsystems